Akaram is a village in (nalgonda) district  Indian state of Telangana. It is located in shaligouraram mandal.

References

Villages in Nalgonda district